USS Redwood (AN-30/YN-25) was an  which was assigned to serve the US Navy during World War II with her protective anti-submarine nets.

Construction
Redwood was laid down by the Amship Lorain, in Lorain, Ohio,  18 October 1940; launched 22 February 1941; and commissioned 12 December 1942.

Service history
Following shakedown, Redwood steamed south to the British West Indies. Engaged in the installation of torpedo nets at Trinidad, until March 1943, she shifted to Antigua, in April, tending nets there through May. Net maintenance activities at Barbados, St. Thomas, and St. Lucia Islands followed and in mid August, she commenced similar activities at Guantanamo Bay. For the remainder of World War II she tended nets there and at ports on Hispaniola.

Reclassified AN-30, 20 January 1944, Redwood returned to Trinidad in August 1945, and through September, assisted in disposal of nets at sea.

Decommissioning
Redwood then sailed for the US East Coast and, after availability at Charleston Navy Yard, she reported on 24 November 1945, to the Atlantic Reserve Fleet at Green Cove Springs, Florida, where she decommissioned 6 June 1947. On 5 June 1961, she was transferred to the Maritime Administration's (MARAD) National Defense Reserve Fleet, James River Reserve Fleet, Lee Hall.

On 21 November 1974, she was sold for non-transportation use to Boston Metals Co., for $33,666.66. She was removed from the fleet on 8 January 1975.

References

Bibliography

 
 
 
 

Aloe-class net laying ships
Ships built in Cleveland
1941 ships
World War II net laying ships of the United States
Atlantic Reserve Fleet, Green Cove Springs Group
James River Reserve Fleet